Lead(II) hydroxide, Pb(OH)2, is a hydroxide of lead, with lead in oxidation state +2. In 1964 it was believed that such a simple compound did not exist, as lead basic carbonate (2PbCO3·Pb(OH)2) or lead(II) oxide (PbO) was encountered where lead hydroxide was expected. This has been a subject of considerable confusion in the past. However, subsequent research has demonstrated that lead(II) hydroxide does indeed exist as one of a series of lead hydroxides.

Preparation
When a hydroxide is added to a solution of a lead(II) salt, a hydrated lead oxide PbO·xH2O (with x < 1) is obtained. Careful hydrolysis of lead(II) acetate solution yields a crystalline product with a formula 6PbO·2H2O = Pb6O4(OH)4.  This material is a cluster compound, consisting of an octahedron of Pb centers, each face of which is capped by an oxide or a hydroxide.  The structure is reminiscent of the Mo6S8 subunit of the Chevrel phases.

Reactions
In solution, lead(II) hydroxide is a somewhat weak base, forming lead(II) ion, Pb2+, under weakly acidic conditions. This cation hydrolyzes and, under progressively increasing alkaline conditions, forms Pb(OH)+, Pb(OH)2(aqueous), Pb(OH)3−, and other species, including several polynuclear species, e.g., Pb4(OH)44+,  Pb3(OH)42+,  Pb6O(OH)64+.

Lead hydrate
The name Lead hydrate has sometimes been used in the past but it is unclear whether this refers to Pb(OH)2 or PbO·xH2O.

References

External links
 Case Studies in Environmental Medicine - Lead Toxicity
 ToxFAQs: Lead
 National Pollutant Inventory - Lead and Lead Compounds Fact Sheet

Hydroxides
Lead(II) compounds